Umkhosi is a Zulu word for "festival" and may refer to:

Umkhosi Wokweshwama, first fruits festival
Umkhosi woMhlanga, reed dance festival